Chkalovsky  is a military air base near Shchyolkovo, Moscow Oblast, Russia. It is located 31 km northeast of Moscow.

In 1932-35, the state flight testing institute was relocated here from Khodynka, the Central Airfield. A reorganisation in December 1960 saw most testing arrangements moved to Akhtubinsk in Astrakhan Oblast.

Chkalovsky provides air support for Star City,  Yuri Gagarin Cosmonauts Training Center, and other elements of the Soviet space program and Russian Federal Space Agency. It is also a major transport base, with the 8th Special Purpose Aviation Division (since 2009–10, the 6991st Air Base) operating the Antonov An-12, Antonov An-72, Tupolev Tu-154, Ilyushin Il-76, and Il-86VKP.  Chkalovsky received USSR's first Il-76K for cosmonaut training on 23 July 1977. On 27 March 1968, Yuri Gagarin and Vladimir Seryogin died in a MiG-15UTI that set off from this base, when it crashed near the town of Kirzhach.

The airport name is also given as Chkalovskoye. The facility should not be confused with Kaliningrad Chkalovsk or Omsk Chkalovsk airfields.

References

External links

Airports in Moscow Oblast
Soviet Air Force bases
Soviet and Russian space program locations
Soviet Military Transport Aviation
Russian Air Force bases